GPSWOX is an online GPS tracking software and fleet management system located in London, United Kingdom. The company was founded in 2014 by the current CEO Martynas Kavaliauskas. The software is used to track objects that include car, van, truck, motorcycle, cargo, boat, bicycle, people, pet and mobile. GPSWOX software is compatible with GPS trackers brands and smartphones.

Features

Real-Time tracking
Software shows the location of objects in real time. This service can be used from any device connected to the Internet. It also provides the additional information about the object: exact address, travel speed, petrol consumption etc.

History and Reports
It preview or download reports in different formats (XLS, PDF, CSV, TXT). Reports can include various information: driving hours, stopovers, distance traveled, fuel consumption etc. by date and GPS tracker name.

Fuel Savings
It checks tank fuel level and fuel consumption along the route. Aggressive driving: speeding, rapid acceleration and braking, directly influencing fuel consumption.

Geofencing
Geofence feature sets up geographic boundaries around areas that have specific interest of user. And then receive automated alerts whenever object enters or leaves those boundaries.

POI & Tools
With POI (Points of Interest) feature add markers at the locations that might be important to user i.e. gas station, a hotel, a restaurant, a shopping mall etc. User can also use tools for calculating distances between places on the map.

Accessories and Sensors 
GPSWOX software supports accessories and sensors includes drivers identification, camera, microphone, battery sensor, ACC ON/OFF, door ON/OFF, engine ON/OFF, fuel tank sensor, GSM sensor, odometer sensor, satellites sensor, tachometer and temperature sensors.

Mobile Tracking Apps 
GPSWOX has released mobile tracking applications: Mobile GPS Tracker, Hidden Mobile GPS Tracker and GPSWOX Mobile Client. With Mobile GPS Tracker app user can transform smartphone to GPS tracker and track it online in real-time.

References 

Technology companies based in London